Ferruccio Bortoluzzi (December 6, 1920 – May 25, 2007) was an Italian modern painter, he was one of the founders of the Centro di Unità della Cultura L'Arco together with venetian artists and writers.

Biography
Born in Venice in 1920, Ferruccio Bortoluzzi received his diploma from the Art Institute there in 1947. He has taught for the same Institute, the Artistic High School as well as for the Senior Course of Industrial Design. Immediately following the war, he was one of the founders of "L'Arco" Cultural Center in Venice. From 1943-2003 he had several one-man shows both in Italy and abroad, for example the Museum of Modern Art of Cà Pesaro (1982 and 2003) and Fondazione Querini Stampalia (2001). Bortoluzzi's works can be seen in public and private collections in Italy and abroad. A contemporary documentation of his artistic activities can be found at the Historical Archive of Contemporary Art in Venice. The artist died in Venice in 2007.

Exhibitions
 Carnegie Museum of Art - 1964, 1967, 1968
 Biennale di Venezia - 1966
 São Paulo Art Biennial - 1969
 Quadriennale di Roma - 1972
 Fondazione Querini Stampalia - 2001
 Ca' Pesaro - 1982, 2003

Museums
 Galleria Nazionale d'Arte Moderna, Rome
 Ca'Pesaro, Venice
 Museo del Novecento, Milan
 Bologna Museum of Modern Art, Bologna
 Museum of Contemporary Art, Zagreb
 MAX Museo, Chiasso

Interview with Bortoluzzi 
"...I remember in the 60s when I first showed my mixed-medium works. They provoked bewilderment, and were even mocked by those collectors who preferred the palette of popular artists to the roughness and asperity of my wood pieces.
I feel profoundly Venetian; son of this extraordinary city. My works are dedicated to Venice. In them you can read the affirmation of its decline, the exaltation of the dull colors typical of damp, foggy, winter days. You can smell the brackish odor of the marshes... For this I would have liked something more.
My exhibitions in Venice were always followed with dedication by the many friends who live here with me among these stones and the marble of these churches which hold up their majestic domes to the sky. And yet, at times the critics were not very kind to me..."

See also

 Abstract art
 Tachisme
 Art Informel
 Arte Povera

References

Bibliography
 Ferruccio Bortoluzzi, Enrico Crispolti, Michele Beraldo, Giovanni Bianchi, Electa, Milano, 2014
 Bortoluzzi, Umbro Apollonio, Serra Editore, Roma, 1966

External links

  Ferruccio Bortoluzzi official site
  Archivio Bortoluzzi 

1920 births
2007 deaths
20th-century Italian sculptors
20th-century Italian male artists
Italian male sculptors
21st-century Italian sculptors
21st-century Italian male artists
Art Informel and Tachisme painters
Italian contemporary artists
20th-century Italian painters
Italian male painters
21st-century Italian painters
Modern artists
Painters from Venice